Laskani Wala is a town in Layyah District of Punjab, Pakistan.

Populated places in Layyah District